Luis Alfonso Manuel Machín (born April 10, 1968 in Rosario, Santa Fe, Argentina), better known as Luis Machín, is an Argentine theater, film and television actor. He is one of the most respected actors in the Argentine artistic medium and his extensive career includes many works in film, theater and television.

Biography 
He was born in Rosario, Santa Fe, Argentina. At 16, Luis Machín decided that he wanted to be an actor. He began studying acting in the theater workshops taught in the secondary school to which he belonged, Manuel Belgrano Commercial of the city of Rosario, attending courses taught by the actor and theater director Miguel Franchi. He continues studying at the Rosarino Center for Theater Research directed by Pepe Costa, where he carries out a large number of works. In 1986 he began studying at the National School of Theater of Rosario that opened that same year and from which he graduated in 1989 in the first promotion. In 1993, at 24 years old, he went to the city of Buenos Aires, Argentina with the aim of settling in this city and expanding his horizons as an artist. Contact the theatrical Sportivo directed by Ricardo Bartís and begins to develop in it. At the same time he takes acting courses with Alberto Ure in Canal 13.

Career 
He is founder, along with other career partners, of the  "Agrupación Filodramática Te quisimos con locura" group with which performs a large number of works, among which stand out Bip- du- bup, La importancia de llamarse Ernesto by Oscar Wilde and Noche de reyes by William Shakespeare. At the same time, he participates in different theater groups in the city such as Centro de Actores by Félix Reinoso, the group Arteón by Néstor Zapata and the group Sauco de Carlos Schwaderer being with the latter with which he made his first international tour in different cities of Spain in 1991 with the show of puppets and actors for adults Cabaretit. Together with the Arteón group and the work Malvinas, canto al sentimiento de un pueblo make a long tour of Venezuela. With El pecado que no se puede nombrar and Ricardo Bartís direction he toured Spain, France, Canada, Brazil, Belgium and Germany participating in the most prestigious international festivals such as Avignon, the autumn of Paris and of the Autumn of Madrid as well as the Kunsten of Belgium and the Theater of Welt of Germany. Then premieres on the Teatro San Martín works like Casa de muñecas by Henrik Ibsen, Lo que va dictando el sueño by Griselda Gambaro, in the circuito alternativo Varios pares de pies sobre piso de mármol work that is taken to Barcelona to an encounter with Harold Pinter, Cercano oriente with Alejandro Catalán, Teatro proletario de cámara in the Sportivo teatral, in the Centro Cultural Recoleta Dios perro and in the Teatro Payro Ella, by Susana Torres Molina. In the Theater The cube premiered Los padres terribles by Jean Cocteau and he comes back to Sportivo Teatral where it premieres La pesca, again with Ricardo Bartís. In 2011 with the direction of Cristina Banegas the only work written by Alberto Ure, La familia argentina and in 2012 with the direction of Daniel Veronese premieres in Argentina and for the commercial circuit La última sesión de Freud by Mark St. Germain.

Filmography

Television

Movies

Awards and nominations

References

1968 births
Argentine male film actors
Argentine male television actors
Living people
Male actors from Rosario, Santa Fe